Mauro Veljačić (born 22 June 1993) is a Croatian professional basketball player who is currently a free agent.

References

1993 births
Living people
Croatian men's basketball players
Guards (basketball)
KK Kvarner 2010 players